Thakur Kesari Singh Barhath (21 November 1872 – 14 August 1941) was a prominent Indian revolutionary leader, freedom fighter, and educationist from the state of Rajasthan. He was the patriarch of the Barhath family, members of which actively participated in anti-British activities including his son Kunwar Pratap Singh Barhath and his brother Thakur Zorawar Singh Barhath. He was also known as Rajasthan Kesari.
He is known for dissuading Maharana Fateh Singh from attending the 1903 Delhi Durbar through his Dingal (Rajasthani) work Chetavani ra Chungatya. He was the founder of 'Veer Bharat Sabha', a revolutionary organization based in Rajasthan. He also co-founded 'Rajasthan Seva Sangh' and 'Rajputana-Madhya Bharat Sabha'. He wrote extensively on the theme of nationalism and independence, and also composed poems in Dingal (Old Rajasthani).

Life and education 
Thakur Kesari Singh Barhath was born on 21 November 1872 in his ancestral Devpura jagir of erstwhile Shahpura State. His father, Thakur Krishna Singh Barhath, was one of the Chief Counsellors to the Maharana of Mewar. He belonged to the Sauda-Barhath lineage of Charans. Singh spent his early childhood in Shahpura. At the age of 8, he joined his father Krishna Singh at Udaipur who was the chief counsellor to the ruler of Mewar. It is there he completed his education.

In Udaipur, Barhath became a scholar of Dingal, Sanskrit, Bengali, Marathi, Gujarati, Hindu scriptures, astronomy, history, and ancient Indian philosophy. He was also taught Indian and European history. By 1889, at the age of 18, he had completed his education.

In 1890, Barhath married Manik Kanwar, sister of Kaviraja Devidan of Kotdi thikana in Kota. He became a father in 1893, naming his son Kunwar Pratap Singh. He resided in the Kaviraja Shyamaldas Haveli in Udaipur.

Career

Chief Counselor to Maharana Mewar 
From 1891, Barhath started working in the service of Maharana Fateh Singh along with his father Krishna Singh Barhath. Due to continued political interference of the British in the administration, he eventually left the service in 1893.

Superintendent Ethnography of Kota State 
After a few years of leaving Udaipur, in 1900, Barhath was invited by the ruler of Kota, Maharao Ummed Singh to serve in his court. Two years later, in 1902, Barhath was appointed as the Ethnography Superintendent of the Kota State. He held this role till his departure in 1907.

Maharao Bhim Singh Library 
Barhath, during his service in Kota State, established the Maharao Bhim Singh Public Library in Kota. It is currently run by the Municipal Corporation of Kota.

Chetavani ra Chungatiya 

In 1903, British Viceroy Lord Curzon held Delhi Durbar to commemorate the coronation of Edward VII. All Indian Kings were invited and required to attend the ceremony showing their fealty to the British Empire. Barhath composed Chetawani ra Chungatiya, a collection of 13 couplets, and exhorted Fateh Singh, Maharana of Mewar, to not attend the Delhi Durbar. Through his composition, he stated the tradition of Maharana's noble ancestors who never became part of the Mughal Court (Durbar), and the importance and the respect the throne of Mewar had in the eyes of Indians. The verses influenced Maharana Fateh Singh and he returned from Delhi without attending the Durbar.

Revolutionary activities 
During 1900–14, Kesari Singh acquired an increasingly hostile view of British rule in India. Noticing the subservient nature of the native rulers towards the British Raj, Barhath believed that by organizing the common soldiers, Rajputs, Charans, and other martial races of Rajputana to take up arms, Rajputana would become free of British, and this way the revolution would spread to rest of India. He found like-minded friends in Arjunlal Sethi of Jaipur and Rao Gopal Singh Kharwa, and later came in contact with revolutionaries in other parts of India like Bal Gangadhar Tilak, Ras Bihari Bose, and Sachindra Nath Sanyal. He became a part of the Revolutionary Party.

Walterkrit Hitkarini Sabha 
Walterkrit Hitkarini Sabha, through the efforts of Kaviraja Shyamaldas, was established in 1880 under the chairmanship of the then Agent to the Governor-General Colonel Walter in Rajputana. Its branches were in almost all the states of Rajputana. Annual conferences of this assembly were held. Proposals etc. were to be passed, but nothing was done beyond that. Barhath actively used the Botta branch of Walterkrit Rajputra Hitkarini Sabha as a medium and through it made constant efforts to make its central organization effective.

In the 1905 annual conference, Barhath proposed that the "Rajputra Hitkarini Sabha" be free from the influence of the British,  Agent to the Governor-General should not be its permanent President but have a Rajput monarch in its place which keeps changing every year. He insisted on taking the proceedings of the Sabha in Hindi and primarily focused on education. From 1905 to 1913, Barhath communicated with high positioned officers in the princely states of Rajputana, Kshatriya officers, and Jagirdars and emphasized caste reforms and the end of outdated practices like the Tika tradition.  He wrote a detailed article in Hindi and English on the reasons for the origin of "Tika-practice" and its ill-effects on AGG and insisted on the end of the same through Hitkarini Sabha.

Nationalist education 
During the period from 1904 to 1913, Barhath made many plans and efforts to promote national education. In his view, English-medium colleges like Mayo College Ajmer, where the feudal and ruling class of Rajputana sent their children to study, were creating an inferiority complex among the students. He wished to promote Nationalist Education in which the students learn about the history, and culture of their nation. In 1904, he prepared a plan for the establishment of a Kshatriya college in Rajputana. In January 1904, in the session of the Kshatriya Mahasabha in Ajmer, the proposal for the establishment of Kshatriya College was passed and a committee was formed under it. Barhath made a lot of effort for the implementation of this plan but due to the fear of repression from the British, he did not receive cooperation from the feudal class in Rajputana.

Mazzini as political guru 
Barhath considered Italy's father of nation Giuseppe Mazzini as his guru in politics. The Hindutva supremacist Vinayak Damodar Savarkar wrote Mazzini's biography in Marathi while studying in London and secretly sent it to Bal Gangadhar Tilak because at that time the book on Mazzini's biography was banned by the British Empire. Barhath did the Hindi translation of this Marathi book.

Veer Bharat Sabha 
In 1910, Barhath established Veer Bharat Sabha.

He got involved in this work at the beginning of the First World War (1914) to prepare for the armed revolution. He sent a parcel of cartridges to the revolutionaries of Banaras and contacted the soldiers of the princely states and the British army.

British scrutiny 
In the intelligence reports of the British government, Barhath was considered particularly responsible for spreading the revolution in Rajputana. In 1912, Barhath's name was at the top of the list of National Archives of India among the persons to be monitored by the British CID.

Kota Murder Case 
To raise funds for the cause, the revolutionaries headed by Barhath found a rich & corrupt mahant Payrelal from Jodhpur. He was brought to Kota on the orders of Barhath and was subsequently killed. Kesari Singh was arrested by the British Government in Shahpura on 21 March 1914 for sedition, conspiracy and murder in the Delhi-Lahore Conspiracy(Mahant Pyarelal) Case.

Even as the trial was going on, the ruler of Shahpura confiscated the property of Barhath including his jagir and haveli in Shahpura.

In this case, Barhath was sentenced to 20 years of rigorous life imprisonment and sent to Hazaribagh Central Jail, Bihar, away from Rajasthan.

Hazaribagh Jail 
Considering Kesari Singh as a terrorist, the British government sent him to Hazaribagh Jail in Bihar province(now Jharkhand), far from Rajputana where he had influential supporters. He vowed not to take food and despite prison authorities' efforts, he subsisted only on milk.

Release from jail 
After the end of World War I in 1919, many political prisoners were released under general amnesty by the British. Under this, Barhath and other important leaders of Rajasthan like Arjun Lal Sethi, and Gopal Singh Kharwa were released.

After his release from Hazari Bagh prison in April 1920, he resumed his denunciations against the British rulers of India, writing a letter to the Governor-General of Abu detailing a proposal for responsible government in Rajasthan and India's princely states. His plan called for a Rajasthan General Assembly comprising two chambers, one made up of representatives from the landlord and the klesser nobility, and a second council representing common people and the peasant and merchant classes.

As Barhath saw it, the proposed assembly should attempt to promote all-around development through "State religious, social, moral, economic, mental, physical and public benevolent powers." In his letter, he declared that the then prevailing system viewed the people as only “a sweet machine to make money,” and governance as a tool to take that money: "The style of governance is neither old nor new, nor a monopoly power or the entire bureaucracy... It is an illusion to cover the fire with a sheet, it is a game or a trick. This is my witness."

Even after his release from jail, Kesari Singh was back in revolutionary plots and conspiracies against the British. In connection to Nimej and Kota Murder Case, the Director of Criminal Intelligence reported as follows:- “Gopal Singh and Kesari Singh were mixed up with the seditionists in British India and were furthering plots and conspiracies directly affecting British India. When the Thakur (Kesari Singh) was called upon to explain he spun out an evasive statement mouth after mouth, and meanwhile continued his plotting, and remained in possession of an extraordinary arsenal of firearms and ammunition.”

News of Pratap's death 
His son, Kunwar Pratap Singh Barhath was arrested in Benras Conspiracy Case for manufacturing bombs. He was sentenced to 5 years of rigorous imprisonment in 1916. Due to continued torture after he refused to reveal the names of his fellow revolutionaries, he died in jail on 7 May 1917. In 1919, Thakur Kesari Singh came back to Kota after being freed from imprisonment, while leaving the station, Dr Guru Dutt who came to receive him asked him that when did you get the information of Pratap's death? Kesari Singh replied with amazing patience, 'Just now'.

Rajasthan Kesari 
He was released from prison in the year 1919. After which, in 1920-21, Barhath shifted to Wardha on invitation by Seth Jamnalal Bajaj. A weekly newspaper named 'Rajasthan Kesari' was started in his name in Wardha, whose editor was Vijay Singh Pathik. Barhath had contact with Mahatma Gandhi in Wardha itself.

Rajasthan Kesari, a weekly newspaper, named in honor of Thakur Kesari Singh Barhath, edited by Vijay Singh Pathik, another revolutionary and associate of Barhath. It was published in Wardha, Maharashtra.

Barhath and Arjun Lal Sethi were active contributors.

Later, it became a mouthpiece for the 'Rajasthan Seva Sangh' and its sister organization 'Rajputana Madhya Bharat Sabha'.

Rajasthan Seva Sangh 
In 1919, Thakur Kesari Singh Barhath met Mahatma Gandhi and on his advice established 'Rajasthan Seva Sangh' at Wardha, along with Arjunlal Sethi and Vijay Singh Pathik. Next year, they shifted the Sabha to Ajmer, which was a British province in the Rajputana States. They also had branches in Kota, Jaipur, and Jodhpur. The main objectives of this organization were:-

 to obtain redress of the grievances of the public;
 to support the rightful claims of the rulers and Jagirdars; and
 to create friendly relations between people and the Jagirdars.

In the 1920s, this Sabha became the leading organization behind the Bijolia peasant movement in Rajasthan. The atrocities committed by the police in Bundi, Sirohi, and Udaipur were highlighted and the 'Rajasthan Kesari' weekly was used for this purpose.

Later, 'Navin Rajasthan', and subsequently 'Tarun Rajasthan', was started as a weekly to work as the mouthpiece. Barhath wrote regular articles to familiarize people with issues.

Rajputana-Madhya Bharat Sabha 
In 1920, Rajputana Madhya Bharat Sabha was established by Barhath along with Gopal Singh Kharwa and Arjunlal Sethi.  The objective of this Sabha was to propagate the ideas of political liberty & freedom in Rajasthan.

Assigned for killing Gibson 
Barhath and Jwala Prasad were assigned the task of killing Gibson. Barhath was provided with a revolver by Vijay Singh Pathik.

Death 
According to his granddaughter, Vijayalakshmi, during the last seven days of illness, Barhath used to recite the verses of the Gita and Upanishads continuously. In his last moments, he was only looking at the picture of his son. When the picture was given in his hand, he spoke a couplet:

“कहाँ जाये कहाँ ऊपने, कहाँ लड़ाये लाड। का जाने केहि खाड में, जाय पड़ेंगे हाड॥”

Thakur Kesari Singh Barhath, a revolutionary and a poet, who had given his life for the freedom of the nation, breathed his last on 14 August 1941 with the utterance of 'Hariom Tat Sat'.

Works 
Source:

 Chetawani ra Chungatiya (13 couplets addressed to Maharana Fateh Singh)
 Kavya-Kusumanjali (based on pun, presented to Lord Curzon)
 Hindi translation of Buddhacharita by Asvaghosa
 Hindi translation of the biography of Giuseppe Mazzini
 Roothi Rani

Legacy 
Singh along with other members of the Barhath family of Shahpura are taught as part of the secondary syllabus in the RBSC board in Rajasthan.

There is a 'Kesari Singh Barhath Colony' on Shahpura-Bhilwara road in Bhilwara, Rajasthan.

Kesari Singh Barhath Panorama 
In November 2022, Rajasthan Chief Minister Ashok Gehlot approved a proposal of Rs 4 crore for the construction of a panorama of freedom fighter Kesari Singh Barath at Shahpura in Bhilwara, which will include a main panorama building, boundary wall, path-way, auditorium, library, audio-video system, various artworks, entrance, statue and inscription. The panorama will provide information about the work and personality of the brave revolutionary Kesari Singh Barhath and educate the younger generation about their rights.

Shaheed Mela 
For the last 50 years, from 1974 onwards, every year on 23 December, Shaeed Mela is celebrated in memory of the Barhath family. It was on this day that in a terrorist act, Zorawar Singh hurled a bomb on the British Viceroy of India in 1912. A fair is organized in their hometown at Shahpura and the event takes place at Shahid Trimurti Memorial which displays the status of Thakur Kesari Singh, Thakur Zorawar Singh, and Kunwar Pratap Singh. The event is presided by the political class including MPs, MLAs, and local politicians.

Portraits in Delhi Assembly 
In January 2019, portraits of revolutionaries of the Barhath Family including Thakur Kesari Singh Barhath, Zorawar Singh Barhath, and Kunwar Pratap Singh Barhath were placed in the gallery of Delhi Assembly .

Haveli of Late Shri Kesari Singh Barhath 
‘Haveli of Late Shri Kesari Singh Barhath’ located in Shahpura is a State Protected Monument under the Government of Rajasthan.

In 2018, On the 100th death anniversary of Pratap Singh Barhath, the Barhath Haveli of Shahpura has been converted to Shri Kesari Singh Barhath Government Museum. The haveli of the Barhath family has now become a national museum, in which their personal weapons and armaments are displayed. It was inaugurated by Onkar Singh Lakahwat and Kailash Meghwal.

Quotes

Rash Behari Bose 
When Master Amirchand introduced Rash Behari Bose to Pratap Singh, Bose was pleased and said:–

“Thakur Kesari Singh Barhath is the only person in India who took a holy resolution to sacrifice himself, brother, son and Jamata(son-in-law) to cut off the chains of the motherland.”

Raghubir Singh Sitamau 
Raghubir Singh, the last ruler of Sitamau princely state:–"Barhath-putra Pratap Singh sacrificed his life, Barhath Kesari Singh did not shirk from his duty even after losing everything and suffering many tortures and his brother Zorawar Singh spent the last twenty-five years of his life wandering in Chambal Kanthe completely unknown."

Swami Karpatri ji Maharaj 
Swami Karpatri ji Maharaj, revered Hindu sanyasi:"Barhath Shri Kesari Singh ji participated with his family in the yagna of freedom struggle and made the name of his dynasty bright. Shri Kesari Singh was an ideal Charan."

Mohan Lal Sukhadia 
Mohan Lal Sukhadia, former Chief Minister of Rajasthan(1954–1971):–"The land of Shahpura is a pilgrimage site for us. Hutatma Kesari Singh Ji, the emissary of the revolution, had made his home on Bedi, a holy land made since the birth of the freedom fighter. Everyone should take inspiration from the lives of Thakur Kesari Singh Ji and Pratap Singh Ji."

Jagjivan Ram 
Jagjivan Ram, former Deputy Prime Minister of India:–"Shri Kesari Singh, his brother Zorawar Singh and Shri Pratap Singh were the brave martyrs from Rajasthan but not only Rajasthan but the whole of India, especially Bihar, where we are equally proud of their martyrdom."

Bhairon Singh Shekhawat 
Bhairon Singh Shekhawat, 11th Vice-President of India:"In the freedom movement, Shri Kesari Singh Barhath led his entire family into the freedom struggle. They were all revolutionaries. He did a job worth writing the name of Rajasthan in golden pages in the history of independence."

Ashok Gehlot 
Ashok Gehlot, 14th Chief Minister of Rajasthan:–"Rajasthan, the land of bravery and valor, was also second to none in the freedom struggle of the country. I pay homage to Shri Kesari Singh Barhath, Shri Zorawar Singh Barhath and Kunwar Pratap Singh Barhath. I am sure that his immortal story will become a powerful medium in the resurgence of the society."

Haridev Joshi 
Haridev Joshi, former Chief Minister of Rajasthan on 25 April 1976:–"Sri Kesari Singh, Sri Pratap Singh and Sri  Zorawar Singh were members of the same family. They sacrificed their lives because they believed it is better to die with self-respect than to be a slave. They led the struggle for freedom with their life. Kesari Singh sacrificed his family for the freedom of India. He stood firm throughout his life, did not break, did not fall."

Vasundhara Raje 
Vasundhara Raje, 13th Chief Minister of Rajasthan:–

"Revolutionary leaders Shri Kesari Singh Barhath and his brother Zorawar Singh Barhath and son Pratap Singh Barhath have made valuable contributions to the freedom movement. The entire family of Shri Barhath has sacrificed everything in the freedom movement. They are all our sources of inspiration."

Barkatullah Khan 
Barkatullah Khan, former Chief Minister of Rajasthan(1971-1973):–"Barhath Kesari Singh ji considered the poverty and hardships of prison life better than the pleasures that were available to him. He himself led the struggle against foreign rule. When no king of Rajputana was openly standing up against foreign power, it was a great deal for Shri Kesari Singh Barhath of Shahpura to stand against the British rule."

Bibliography

Further reading

References

External links
 Amrit Mahotsav - Digital District Repository - Kesari Singh Barhath
 Charans.org (चारण समागम) - ठा. केसरी सिंह बारहट

External links
 

Barhath family of Shahpura
1872 births
1941 deaths
Indian male poets
Rajasthani-language writers
Indian independence activists from Rajasthan
People from Bhilwara district
Poets from Rajasthan
19th-century Indian poets
20th-century Indian poets
19th-century Indian male writers
20th-century Indian male writers
Charan
Rajasthani people
Indian Hindus
Administrators in the princely states of India
Prisoners and detainees of British India
Social workers from Rajasthan
Scholars from Rajasthan
Indian social reformers
Indian nationalists
People from Rajasthan
Indian royalty
Dingal poets